Fatal Design is the fifth studio album by Finnish gothic metal band, Entwine. It was released in 2006 on Spinefarm Records.

Track listing

All music and lyrics written by Entwine
All songs arranged by Entwine and Janne Joutsenniemi

 "Fatal Design" - 3:58
 "Chameleon Halo" - 3:33
 "Out of You" - 3:45
 "Surrender" - 3:50
 "Oblivion" - 4:10
 "Twisted" - 3:54
 "Insomniac" - 4:20
 "My Serenity" - 4:05
 "Break Me" - 4:48
 "Curtained Life" - 5:45

Personnel

Mika Tauriainen - Vocals
Tom Mikkola - Guitar
Jaani Kähkönen - Guitar
Joni Miettinen - Bass
Aksu Hanttu - Drums
Riitta Heikkonen - Keyboards, vocals

Additional personnel

Heikki Heikki Pöyhiä - Backing vocals
Jules Näveri - Additional vocals on 'Twisted'
Aksu Hanttu - Programming
Jake Kilpiö - Additional Programming

Charts

Notes
Engineered by Aksu Hanttu and Jaani Kähkönen
Drums engineered by Aleksanteri Kuosa
Mixed by Mikko Karmila at Finnvox Studios, Finland
Mastered by Thomas Eberger at Cutting Room, Stockholm
 Cover art and design by Tomi Tauriainen
Band photography by Jani Mahkonen
E-logo by Jani Saajanaho
Japanese release features bonus track 'Hearts Of Frozen Stone'
A remixed version of the song 'Break Me' is featured in a YouTube fan film sequel entitled "JC's Halloween II".

Singles

'Surrender'
'Chameleon Halo'

Videos

External links
Official Entwine Website

Entwine albums
2006 albums
Spinefarm Records albums